Jaaneman is a 2012 Indian Bengali-language romantic action film starring Koel Mallick and Soham Chakraborty in the lead roles. It is a remake of the 2010 Tamil film Paiyaa.

Cast
 Koel Mallick as Ria
 Soham Chakraborty as Deba
 Ashish Vidyarthi as Sridhar
 Partho Sarathi Chakraborty as Joga
 Rajat Ganguly as Ria's Uncle
 Saswati Guhathakurta as Rhea's Grandma

Soundtrack

References

External links
 

2010s romantic action films
Indian romantic action films
Bengali remakes of Tamil films
2012 masala films
Indian road movies
Bengali-language Indian films
2010s Bengali-language films
Films directed by Raja Chanda
Films scored by Jeet Ganguly